Koi Chand Rakh is a 2018 Pakistani television series premiered on 19 July 2018 on ARY Digital. The series ended its run on 14 February 2019. It is written by Maha Malik and directed by Siraj-ul-Haque. It is created by Abdullah Seja of Idream Entertainment. It stars Ayeza Khan, Imran Abbas, Areeba Habib and Muneeb Butt in lead.

The show was met with mixed to negative reception throughout its run, being criticised for its clichéd plot and poor characterisation, but was a rating success nonetheless.

Plot 

Dr. Rabail (Ayeza Khan) is a caring, young woman whose parents died when she was five years. She was raised by her maternal uncle Asad Niazi and his wife Nafeesa. Asad and Nafeesa have a daughter and a son of their own Nishaal (Areeba Habib) and Umair (Muneeb Butt). Rabail, being much elder than Umair, always took care of him like an elder sister, but she was not aware that Umair had developed feelings for her. When he reveals his feelings, Rabail is horrified, as she always saw him as a younger brother. Nafeesa overhears the conversation and decides that the best solution is to get Rabail married as soon as possible.

There is a parallel story of Zain (Imran Abbas), the son of a wealthy business man. Zain is a carefree man who is shallowly obsessed with looks. He sees Nishaal and instantly falls madly in love with her beauty. When he approaches her a misunderstanding leads him, mistakenly believe Nishaal's name is Rabail. On numerous occasions he meets Nishaal, who despite, at first, ignoring him grows to like him. Zain discovers that the girl he loves is his father's friend Asad Niazi's daughter and sends a proposal. Rabail, under pressure from Nishaal, tricks Umair into going to college with the promise that she'll wait for him. Umair is satisfied and leaves for college. But the real plan Rabail, Nafeesa, and Nishaal have is to get Rabail married, while he's away.

Nishaal finds out that the proposal for Rabail is from Zain. Both Zain and Nishaal are heartbroken because they had fallen in love, even though they had not spent much time together. Nishaal tells Zain how she had come to see him as her "ideal" man, but Zain refuses to accept this, as for the first time in his life, he's made his father proud. Zain does not want to spoil this new relationship with his father, so he sacrifices his love to Rabail. Umair learns about the betrayal, arriving too late -  as Rabail and Zain are celebrating the Nikaah ceremony, and has a nervous breakdown.

Zain and Nishaal try to make each other jealous through manipulative games; Zain by pretending to have feelings for Rabail, and Nishaal by flirting with Zain's best friend, Zia. After getting married Zain deserts Rabail on the wedding night because he cannot sleep with her. Zain and Nishaal their relationship, however Zain's father, Ibrar, discovers this and suffers a heart attack but before dying he makes Zain promise to never divorce Rabail. Zain agrees to fulfill his father's last wish despite being in love with Nishaal.

After patching up with Zain, Nishaal completely ignores Zia, who hasn't given up his feelings for her. Zia gets revenge by getting engaged to Zain's sister, Sobia, (who he knew had a crush on him), and disappears on the wedding day. While Rabail makes Zia realize his mistake and helps them get married, Zain leaves Rabail to  get Nikkahfied with Nishaal. As Zain sets up house with Nishaal, Rabail finds out she is pregnant, but she receives full support from Zain's mother, Gulshan., who tries her best to bring Rabail and Zain back together.  Despite Nishaal's attempts to persuade Zain to divorce Rabail, he avoids this.

A year after Rabail gives birth to their daughter, Ujala, Zain realizes that he doesn't truly love Nishaal.  He sees her for who she really is: a woman who knows nothing about love, family values and respects no one and he was never really happy with her because she is shallow. He has learned that beauty isn't everything and regret not valuing Rabail's moral and cultural values. When Zain tries to go back to Rabail, apologizing for everything he has done, the innocent Rabail has become cold-hearted. He finds out, too late, that it is not easy to forgive so easily when the wounds are deep. Meanwhile, when Gulshan dies, Zain is full of guilt and regret, and begs Rabail for forgiveness.

Nishaal returns, still furious with Zain,  who has started having feelings for Rabail. After waiting for a whole day for Zain to come home she goes to his house, but is met with a slap from an unwelcoming Zain. In fury, she leaves a report which shows she's pregnant. Nishaal tries to commit suicide but having been followed is saved yet suffers the loss of her child. She initially tries to blame Rabail for her loss of but discovers her friend actually saved her life. 
 
Umair and Zain arrive at Rabail's house at the same time and before Zain leaves, come to a reluctant truce then part with Umair assuring Zain he will ask Rabail to forgive Zain.  After refusing Zain's plea to return home, she accepts Umair's love. It ends Umair and Rabail enjoying the rain and Zain regretting he has no loved ones left.

Cast

Soundtrack

The title song was sung by Rahat Fateh Ali Khan. The music was composed by Shani Arshad and the lyrics were written by Sabir Zafar.
It has more than 25 million views on YouTube.

Production
The series was earlier titled Yeh Galat Fehmi Mere Naam Ke  considering the title song of the series, but the makers changed it to Koi Chand Rakh.

International Broadcasts

Awards and nominations

References

External links 
Koi Chand Rakh on ARYDigital.TV

2018 Pakistani television series debuts
Pakistani drama television series
Urdu-language television shows
ARY Digital original programming